The WindRider 16 is a small trimaran sailboat with foot pedal steering launched by WindRider LLC in 1995 for 1-3 adults. It was designed by well known multihull sailboat designer Jim Brown.  Production had ended by 2020.

See also
 List of multihulls

References

Trimarans
Sailboat types built by WindRider LLC